Harmony is a town in Somerset County, Maine, United States. The population was 825 at the 2020 census.

Geography

Climate
This climatic region is typified by large seasonal temperature differences, with warm to hot (and often humid) summers and cold (sometimes severely cold) winters.  According to the Köppen Climate Classification system, Harmony has a humid continental climate, abbreviated "Dfb" on climate maps. Harmony has very wide diurnal temperature ranges in winter, with a  difference between average highs and lows in February.

Demographics

2010 census
As of the census of 2010, there were 939 people, 399 households, and 273 families living in the town. The racial makeup of the town was 96.5% White, 0.1% African American, 0.4% Native American, 0.7% Asian, 0.3% from other races, and 1.9% from two or more races. Hispanic or Latino of any race were 0.5% of the population.

There were 399 households, of which 24.3% had children under the age of 18 living with them, 54.6% were married couples living together, 7.8% had a female householder with no husband present, 6.0% had a male householder with no wife present, and 31.6% were non-families. 25.3% of all households were made up of individuals, and 13.1% had someone living alone who was 65 years of age or older. The average household size was 2.35 and the average family size was 2.79.

The median age in the town was 49.4 years. 19.1% of residents were under the age of 18; 3.8% were between the ages of 18 and 24; 19.9% were from 25 to 44; 36.2% were from 45 to 64; and 20.9% were 65 years of age or older. The gender makeup of the town was 50.1% male and 49.9% female.

2000 census
As of the census of 2000, there were 954 people, 388 households, and 301 families living in the town.  The population density was 24.6 people per square mile (9.5/km2).  There were 522 housing units at an average density of 13.5 per square mile (5.2/km2).  The racial makeup of the town was 97.59% White, 0.94% Native American, 0.42% Asian, 0.21% from other races, and 0.84% from two or more races.

There were 388 households, out of which 25.8% had children under the age of 18 living with them, 60.3% were married couples living together, 10.3% had a female householder with no husband present, and 22.4% were non-families. 17.5% of all households were made up of individuals, and 8.5% had someone living alone who was 65 years of age or older.  The average household size was 2.45 and the average family size was 2.70.

In the town, the population was spread out, with 20.5% under the age of 18, 6.2% from 18 to 24, 25.8% from 25 to 44, 29.1% from 45 to 64, and 18.3% who were 65 years of age or older.  The median age was 44 years. For every 100 females, there were 96.7 males.  For every 100 females age 18 and over, there were 94.9 males.

The median income for a household in the town was $23,843, and the median income for a family was $26,131. Males had a median income of $23,036 versus $18,056 for females. The per capita income for the town was $12,360.  About 16.1% of families and 20.3% of the population were below the poverty line, including 25.1% of those under age 18 and 14.4% of those age 65 or over.

Popular culture

Location filming for the 1990 movie Graveyard Shift, based on the short story by Stephen King, took place in Harmony.

Notable people 

 Helen Marr Hurd, educator, poet
 Freeman Knowles, U. S. congressman from South Dakota
 Clyde Smith, U. S. congressman and husband of Margaret Chase Smith
 Bartlett Tripp, Chief Justice of the Dakota Territory Supreme Court 1885–1889, lawyer, and diplomat

References

External links

Towns in Somerset County, Maine
Towns in Maine